Ch'aska Urqu may refer to the following:

 Ch'aska Urqu (Nor Lípez)
 Ch'aska Urqu (Sud Lípez)